After the Kargil war that took place in 1999 between Indian Army and Pakistani soldiers and irregulars in the Kargil sector of India, there were allegations of corruption in the purchase of coffins by the then Government of India. The government had incurred a heavy loss of 187,000 dollars in the entire transaction. Comptroller and Auditor General of India's report had found several fraud in the transaction of coffins. The caskets were purchased from Buitron and Baiza, a company based in United States of America rendering funeral services. The then ruling government National Democratic Alliance had purchased 500 caskets worth $2500 each which was presumed to be thirteen times the original amount. However, the ambassador from both the countries India and United States of America had declared in writing that those caskets had a cost worth $2,768 dollars each.

The CBI investigated the case and filed a charge sheet against three Indian Army officers in August 2009. In December 2013, a special CBI court found no evidence and hence discharged all the accused.

CBI Investigation

The Central Bureau of Investigation (CBI) registered a case in June 2006 registered a case under sections 420 (cheating), 120 B (criminal conspiracy) and the Prevention of Corruption Act, 1988. The CBI filed a charge sheet in August 2009. Three major Indian Army officers and a company based in the United States were named in the charge sheet. The three Army officers named were Major General Arun Roye, Colonel SK Malik and Colonel FB Singh. Victor Baiza, a US National who supplied the aluminium casket and body bags to the Indian Army was also named in the charge sheet. However, the then defense minister George Fernandes was not included in the report and was later given a clean chit from the scam.

In December 2013, a special CBI court found no evidence and hence discharged all the accused.

Supreme Court verdict 
On Oct 13, 2015, the Supreme Court Of India absolved former Defence Minister George Fernandes and former Prime Minister Atal Bihari Vajpayee of all wrongdoing in the Kargil coffin scam.

See also
 Corruption in India
 Socio-economic issues in India
 Corruption Perceptions Index

References

Political corruption in India
Corruption in defence procurement in India
Kargil War

hi:भारत के घोटालों की सूची (वर्ष के अनुसार)